Jordan Blount (born 5 January 1997) is an Irish professional basketball player. He played college basketball for UIC.

Early life and career
Growing up on the north side of Cork, Blount was obsessed with basketball from an early age, frequently player in older age groups. At the age of 15, after being tagged the best player Ireland had seen in decades, he moved to England to join the Plymouth Raiders youth team and won the BCS Cup while also playing and getting some minutes with the BBL team. Blount received interest from professional teams such as Real Madrid and Estudiantes but ended up joining Canarias Basketball Academy, as he had the desire to play college basketball in the United States. He was recruited by Georgia Tech although they wanted him to attend a preparatory school. After two years playing with Canarias, Blount enrolled at the SPIRE Academy. He committed to UIC. Blount had received a number of D1 offers but said he chose UIC because of his relationships with the staff.

College career
Blount did not play his freshman year at UIC due to some NCAA restraints. As a sophomore, he averaged 6.8 points, 6.8 rebounds, and 2.3 assists per game. On 5 December 2018, Blount scored a career-high 27 points in a 94-75 win against Illinois State. Blount averaged 9.3 points and 5.6 rebounds per game as a junior. He suffered an ACL tear in June 2019 but returned to the court in December 2019. As a senior at UIC, Blount averaged 6.3 points, 4.0 rebounds, and 1.1 assists per game. Though he had an additional year of eligibility, he opted to turn professional.

Professional career
On 14 August 2020, Blount signed with Basket Navarra Club of the LEB Plata. After playing in three games, he parted ways with the team. Blount averaged 11.3 points, 4.7 rebounds and 1.7 steals per game. On 17 November, he signed with Força Lleida of the LEB Oro. Blount averaged 1.8 points and 1.3 rebounds per game in four games. He signed with CD Carbajosa of the LEB Plata on 26 January 2021.

In August 2021, Blount signed with Úrvalsdeild karla club Þór Akureyri. He was released in November the same year due to an injury.

National team career
Blount played for the Irish under-18 basketball team in the 2015 FIBA Europe Under-18 Championship Division B and averaged 25.4 points, 9.2 rebounds, 3.3 steals and 2.6 assists per game. He played for the Irish under-20 basketball team at the 2016 FIBA U20 European Championship Division B, averaging 12.8 points, 8.5 rebounds, and 2.8 assists per game. Blount represented Ireland at the 2018 FIBA European Championship for Small Countries in San Marino. In four games, he averaged 8.8 points, 5.0 rebounds, 1.8 assists and 1.0 steals per game, helping Ireland win a bronze medal. Blount participated in the 2021 FIBA European Championship for Small Countries and helped Ireland win gold. He averaged 14.0 points, 10.5 rebounds and 5.5 assists per game and was named to the All-Star Five.

Personal life
His father Gary Blount was an Irish basketball referee and coach. He died in October 2020. Blount's siblings Gareth, Colm and Mollie also play basketball.

References

External links
UIC Flames bio

1997 births
Living people
Irish men's basketball players
Irish expatriate basketball people in Spain
Irish expatriate basketball people in the United States
UIC Flames men's basketball players
Força Lleida CE players
Sportspeople from Cork (city)
Small forwards
Irish expatriate basketball people in Iceland
Úrvalsdeild karla (basketball) players
Þór Akureyri men's basketball players